Kids Can Press is a Canadian-owned publisher of children's books, with a catalog near 1000 picture books and 500 e-books, non-fiction and fiction titles for toddlers to young adults. The Kids Can Press list includes characters such as Franklin the Turtle which has sold over 65 million books in over 30 languages around the world.

It was chosen as the principal distributor of the Indigenous Peoples Atlas of Canada.

Description
Kids Can Press started in 1973 as an initiative from the Ontario College of Art to take advantage of growing nationalism within Canada during the '70s to provide locally relevant children's material. In 1986, the publisher became a privately owned business ran by Valerie Hussey and Ricky Englander. In 1998, the company was purchased by Canadian animation firm Nelvana for $6.1 million. Englander left that year. In 2000, Nelvana itself was acquired by Corus Entertainment, who has operated Kids Can Press since. Hussey remained at the company until 2006, when she stepped down and was replaced by Lisa Lyons.

Kids Can Press has published in partnership with more Canadian public institutions than any other children's publisher. Partners include: the Royal Ontario Museum, the Ontario Science Centre, the Federation of Ontario Naturalists, the National Museum, the Museum of Nature, World Wildlife and the National Hockey League.

Kids Can Press books have received critical acclaim and numerous nominations and awards. Some highlights include:
 Winning the Governor General's Literary Award for Children's Illustration in 2011 for Cybèle Young's Ten Birds.
 Franklin the Turtle series of stamps issued by Canada Post in May 2012, on the 25th anniversary of the publication of the first Franklin book.
 Winning both Governor General's Literary Awards for children's literature in 2008 for John Ibbitson’s The Landing (English-language text) and Stéphane Jorisch’s The Owl and the Pussycat (illustration)
 Mélanie Watt's multiple award-winning Scaredy Squirrel series
 The Independent Publisher Book Award for If the World Were A Village by David J. Smith
 Ryan and Jimmy And the Well in Africa That Brought Them Together by Herb Shoveller, a featured selection on Oprah.com.
 Receiving a Kirkus Starred Review for My Name is Elizabeth! by Annika Dunklee

See also

 One Hen

References

External links

Book publishing companies of Canada
Children's book publishers
Companies based in Toronto
Publishing companies established in 1973
Corus Entertainment subsidiaries